The Pista Atletica Aguadilla is a 1,000-seat association football stadium on the campus of the University of Puerto Rico at Aguadilla in Aguadilla, Puerto Rico. As of the 2019-20 Liga Puerto Rico season, it hosts the home matches of Ramey SC.

References

External links
Soccerway profile

Football venues in Puerto Rico